Hitar Petar Nunatak (
, ‘Nunatak Hitar Petar’ \'nu-na-tak 'hi-t&r 'pe-t&r\) is the rocky hill rising to 434 m on the coast of Prince Gustav Channel, facing Alectoria Island and next south of the terminus of Aitkenhead Glacier on Trinity Peninsula in Graham Land, Antarctica.

The nunatak is "named after the Bulgarian folkloric hero Hitar Petar (‘Sly Peter’)".

Location
German-British mapping in 1996.

Maps
 Trinity Peninsula. Scale 1:250000 topographic map No. 5697. Institut für Angewandte Geodäsie and British Antarctic Survey, 1996.
 Antarctic Digital Database (ADD). Scale 1:250000 topographic map of Antarctica. Scientific Committee on Antarctic Research (SCAR). Since 1993, regularly updated.

References

External links
 Hitar Petar Nunatak. Copernix satellite image

Nunataks of Trinity Peninsula
Bulgaria and the Antarctic